Between late 1957 and March 1958 the Australia national rugby union team – the Wallabies – conducted a world tour encompassing Britain, Ireland, France and Canada on which they played five Tests and thirty-one minor tour matches. The Wallabies won 17, lost 16 and drew three of their games in total. They lost all five Tests of the tour.

The squad's leadership
Versatile back Dick Tooth had made 10 Test appearances for Australia before the tour and had captained the Wallabies well in two 1957 Tests against the All Blacks. Howell expresses a view that it was inexplicable that Tooth was not selected for the tour and partially blames this as cause of the disappointing tour result. However Howell writes that Bob Davidson possessed outstanding qualities to make him a natural touring captain. He was a born leader of men, was immensely popular, he met people well, was highly intelligent and spoke well in public. He played in 32 of the 41 tour games and did everything in his power to make the tour a success.

Veteran second-rower Alan Cameron had captained the Wallabies in 18 matches in 1955 and 1956 but was no longer supreme in his position nor guaranteed of Test selection. However he made a superb contribution to the tour playing in 22 matches including one Test and captained the side in seven mid-week matches

As per tradition, Assistant Manager Dave Cowper assumed the coaching duties. Howell writes that in spite of the mounting losses, Cowper "ever the gentleman, never criticised the players, even when he had every right to....he personified the true amateur, playing always to the rules with a strict code of ethics" Squad member Nicholas Shehadie was less complimentary in his published recollections suggesting Cowper had limited imagination as a coach with "our training devoid of variety which made it very tedious."

Tour details
The squad was on tour for eight months in total and travelled to England by ship. Shehadie reports that the team issue consisted of " two blazers, a pair of grey slacks, four green ties with a hand-painted wallaby on each, a heavy pullover and a track suit. In addition, each player received one pair of boots – with another pair to be issued in England – sandshoes for training on the ship, a heavy woollen scarf and tablets to counteract sea-sickness, Vitamin C tablets to counteract colds in Britain and a packet of tranquiliser tablets to be used at the player's own discretion"''' He recalls that the squad's pocket money was 10s a day, up from 5s a decade before.

Matches of the TourScores and results list Australia's points tally first.Test matches

Wales

AUSTRALIA: Terry Curley, Roderick Phelps, Kenneth Donald, Jim Lenehan, Jack Potts, Arthur Summons, Des Connor, Nicholas Shehadie, Norman Hughes, Peter Fenwicke, Tony Miller, David Emanuel, John Thornett, James Brown, Robert Davidson (captain) 

WALES: Terry Davies, John Collins, Gordon Wells, Cyril Davies, Ray Williams, Carwyn James, Wynne Evans, Don Devereux, Bryn Meredith, Ray Prosser, Rhys Williams, Roddy Evans, Robin Davies, Clem Thomas (captain), John Faull

Ireland

Shehadie writes in his memoirs that his response to Noel Murphy continually blocking his vision in the scrum was to deal him a punch in an ensuing scrum. He recalls that the Lansdowne Rd crowd booed the Australian team and that press afterwards singled out Shehadie for his brutal play. He suggests that Dave Cowper then determined to make an example of him and true to his word did not select him in another Test of the tour. It was therefore Shehadie's last Test match, as it would also be for Australia's other forward veteran Alan Cameron.

AUSTRALIA: Terry Curley, Kenneth Donald, Saxon White, Jack Potts, Roderick Phelps, Arthur Summons, Des Connor, Nicholas Shehadie, James Brown, Robert Davidson (captain), Alan Cameron, David Emanuel, John Thornett Norman Hughes, Peter Fenwicke 

IRELAND: Patrick Berkery, Tony O'Reilly, Noel Henderson (c), Dave Hewitt, Cecil Pedlow, Jackie Kyle, Andy Mulligan, Patrick O'Donoghue, Ronnie Dawson, Gordon Wood, James Stevenson, Bill Mulcahy, James Donaldson, Noel Murphy, James Kavanagh Alan Cameron

England

This was the day Twickenham booed, a rare sound at the august ground. But when big Jim Lenehan tackled Phil Horrocks-Taylor late and so heavily that he was taken off the field, the crowd were annoyed. Every time Lenehan touched the ball, the crowd booed.

The scores were 3–0 at half time, but soon Malcolm Phillips scored a great try and then the elegant Terry Curley gave the Wallabies the lead with a drop goal. When injury time came the score was 6-all. Then came the only try of the match by brilliant Peter Jackson.  Jackson out on the wing, got a pass on the Wallaby 25. He was not the fastest of wings – but he was deceptive and knew sidestep, swerve and hand-off, and used them as deadly weapons. He swerved away from Rod Phelps and handed him off. He moved to cut in, plonking Terry Curley onto the wrong foot as he beat him on the outside. Phelps was gaining, the line was approaching, Phelps was faster and Jackson dived with Phelps on his back.

It was England's first post-war Test victory over one of the three Southern powers.

AUSTRALIA: Terry Curley, Rod Phelps, Kenneth Donald, Jim Lenehan, Saxon White, Arthur Summons, Des Connor, Kevin Ryan, Norman Hughes, Peter Fenwicke, Tony Miller, David Emanuel, Geoffrey Vaughan, James Brown, Robert Davidson (captain) 

ENGLAND: James Hetherington, Peter Jackson, Malcolm Phillips, Jeff Butterfield, Peter Thompson, Phil Horrocks-Taylor, Dickie Jeeps, Ned Ashcroft, Ronald Syrett, Peter Robbins, David Marques, John Currie, Ron Jacobs, Eric Evans (captain), George Hastings 

Scotland

AUSTRALIA: Terry Curley, Kenneth Donald, Jim Lenehan, Saxon White, Roderick Phelps, Arthur Summons, Des Connor, Geoffrey Vaughan, James Brown, Robert Davidson (captain), Tony Miller, David Emanuel, Eddie Purkiss, John Thornett, Norman Hughes 

SCOTLAND: Robin Chisholm, Arthur Smith (captain), George Stevenson, James Docherty, Thomas Weatherstone, Gordon Waddell, Tremayne Rodd, Hugh McLeod, Norman Bruce, Tom Elliot, Malcolm Swan, Hamish Kemp, Ken Smith, Adam Robson, Jim Greenwood 

France

AUSTRALIA: Terry Curley, Alan Morton, Jim Lenehan, Roderick Phelps, Otto Fox, Ron Harvey, Des Connor, Geoffrey Vaughan, James Brown, Robert Davidson (captain), Tony Miller, David Emanuel, Ken Yanz, John Thornett, Norman Hughes 

FRANCE: Michel Vannier, Henir Rancolue, Maurice Prat, Roger Martine, Pierre Tarricq, Antoince Labazuy, Pierre Lacroix, Aldo Quaglio, Robert Vigier, Alfred Roques, Lucien Mias, Michel Celaya (captain), Michel Crauste, Henir Domec, Jean Barthe 

Touring party

Manager: Terry McLenaughan
Assistant manager (Coach) : Dave Cowper
Captain: Bob Davidson
Vice-captain : Alan Cameron

Squad

The team's most experienced centre three quarter Jim Phipps ( 11 caps prior to tour) played 7 of the first 9 games but broke his leg against Glasgow and Edinburgh and did not play again on tour.

The Wallabies played a match in Perth on the way to England during which lock Stewart Scotts broke a wrist and feared he would be left at home. Management decided the six weeks boat trip would give him sufficient time to recover, a decision vindicated by his playing several mid- week games during the tour.

Sources

Footnotes

Bibliography
 Howell, Max (2005) Born to Lead – Wallaby Test Captains, Celebrity Books, Auckland NZ
 Shehadie, Nicholas (2003) A Life Worth Living'', Simon & Schuster Australia

Online references
Jackson's try from Planet-Rugby.com

1957 rugby union tours
1958 rugby union tours
1957-58
1957-58
1957-58
1957-58
1957-58
1957-58
1957–58 in English rugby union
Five Nations
1957–58 in Scottish rugby union
1957–58 in French rugby union
austr
1957 in Australian rugby union
1958 in Australian rugby union